In Greek mythology, Alexanor (Ancient Greek: Ἀλεξάνωρ) was a son of Machaon, and grandson of the Greek god Asclepius, who built to his grandfather a temple on the summit of Titane in the territory of Sicyon.  Around it there were dwellings for the use of those who came to solicit the aid of the god.  Alexanor himself too was worshiped there, and sacrifices were offered to him, but only after sunset.

Notes

Alexanor had great respect for his grandfather and was proud of his heritage so proud he built a temple in his honor he himself would in up being worshiped there along with his grandfather but only after sun set

References 

 Pausanias, Description of Greece with an English Translation by W.H.S. Jones, Litt.D., and H.A. Ormerod, M.A., in 4 Volumes. Cambridge, MA, Harvard University Press; London, William Heinemann Ltd. 1918. . Online version at the Perseus Digital Library
 Pausanias, Graeciae Descriptio. 3 vols. Leipzig, Teubner. 1903.  Greek text available at the Perseus Digital Library.

Greek mythological heroes
Asclepius in mythology
Sicyon